Industrial Green Chemistry World (IGCW), previously known as Industrial Green Chemistry Workshop, is the first and largest Industrial convention which focuses on expanding, implementing and commercializing green chemistry and green engineering based technologies and products in the chemical industry. The first event was held in Powai, Mumbai, in 2009.

The event is mainly divided into four sub-events - the Symposium, the Expo, the Awards and the Seminars. The IGCW Symposium is a platform where expert speakers from the academia and the industry deliver presentations on green sustainable innovations and achievements. The Expo is a platform for organizations from the chemical and pharmaceutical industry to exhibit their latest green chemistry innovations. The IGCW award recognizes outstanding research and initiatives in green chemistry and engineering to promote innovation in cleaner, cheaper, smarter chemistry developments that have been or can be utilized by the industry to achieve pollution prevention goals.

History

IGCW is a biennial event dedicated to the cause of implementing and commercializing green chemistry and engineering on a large scale. The event is jointly organized by Green ChemisTree Foundation and Newreka Green Synth Technologies Pvt. Ltd. The first event, which was held in 2009, addressed the need of the Indian chemical industry's future direction with global trends in sustainability, besides exploring opportunities for leveraging industrial green chemistry models for business differentiation and competitiveness. Over 300 participants from the chemical industry; 65% from chemical companies, 15% from academic and research institutes, 13% students and 7% officials from governments, their associates and societal bodies made up the attendees at the event.

Overview
Industrial Green Chemistry World (IGCW) has a special focus primarily over the four most chemistry-intensive sectors:
 Pharmaceuticals
 Agro-chemicals
 Dyes & Pigments
 Specialty, Fine and Performance Chemicals.

IGCW 2009

The first event was held on December 4 to 6, 2009, at Hotel Renaissance in Mumbai, India. It served as a major milestone to create awareness and provide the momentum for green chemistry and engineering technologies. It addressed the need of the Indian chemical industry's future direction with global trends in sustainability, besides exploring opportunities for leveraging industrial green chemistry models for business differentiation and competitiveness. The event was organized by Newreka GreenSynth Pvt. Ltd., Green Chemistry Network Center, University of Delhi, the Indian Chapter of American Chemical Society-GCI-USA and co-organized by Chemical Industry Digest and Block Dale Publications, Mumbai. The event also served as an interaction and learning platform for over 300 stakeholders from the chemical industry, with 64% participation from the representatives of chemical companies, 16% from academic and research institutes, 13% students and 7% officials from the Government, their associates and societal bodies. Over 300 chief delegates from pharmaceuticals, bulk drugs, agro based companies, dye and pigments, fine and specialty chemical companies participated in the event.

For the first time in the history of chemical industry, the event attracted active participation and leadership from leading experts of green chemistry from around the world. Dr. Paul Anastas and Dr. John Warner, considered as the fathers of green chemistry, Dr. Bob Peoples, Director of the American Chemical Society, Dr. John Peterson Myers, CEO & Chief Scientist at Environmental Health Services, USA, Dr. Kira Matus, Sr. Policy Analyst at the Center for green chemistry and green engineering at Yale University, USA, were among them. It recognized outstanding research initiatives in the field of green chemistry and engineering to promote pollution prevention models. The award winners included PI Industries in the 'MNCs and Large Enterprises' category and Catapharma Pvt. Ltd. in the 'Start-up to Medium Scale Enterprises' category. Through the IGCW awards, these upcoming companies received national recognition for their outstanding technologies that incorporated the principles of green chemistry into chemical designing, manufacturing and use, and that have been or can be utilized by them in achieving their pollution prevention goals. Team Biosynth from IIT-Bombay received the award for 'Innovation and Research' in the field of green chemistry and engineering in the 'Students Category'. The promotion of green technology via production of bio-diesel by a team of undergraduate students was appreciated by the eminent personalities who visited the workshop. This award was presented by Dr. Paul Anastas and Dr. John Warner.

IGCW 2011
Exhibits included concepts like switchable solvents, intelligent fluids, micro-reactors, recyclable enzyme catalysts, etc. The technical seminars shed light on green chemical processes, solvents, catalysts, matrices & measurements, and engineering. The companies showcasing at the IGCW-Expo came in all sizes, small;medium and large industries like Tata Chemicals’ Innovation Center, Excel Industries, Godavari Biorefineries, Lonza, etc. Eight laboratories under the Council for Scientific and Industrial Research(CSIR) along with professors from the Institute Chemical Technology(ICT) and Indian Institute of Technology (IIT-B) also demonstrated their technologies.

References

External links 
 IGCW Official Website
 Newreka Green Synth Technologies Pvt. Ltd.
 Green ChemisTree Foundation

Chemical industry